Jules Marcel Gros (2 February 1890 – 25 December 1992) was a Breton linguist specializing in the Breton language. He was born in Paris.

Gros' studies began very early in the twentieth century, from his grandmother and other people in his village who were still unilingual Breton speakers. Gros authored Stylistique Trégorroise and various dictionaries of Breton. His books were used by a generation of students, and continue to be important as reference works cataloguing the speech patterns of the Breton language.

Gros died on 25 December 1992 in Trédrez-Locquémeau.

See also 
 Celtic languages
 Brittonic languages

References

External links 

 

Linguists from France
1890 births
1992 deaths
Linguists of Breton
French centenarians
Writers from Brittany
University of Rennes alumni
French male writers
Breton-language writers
20th-century linguists
20th-century French male writers
Men centenarians